Cham Khalaf-e Isa Rural District is a rural district (dehestan) in Cham Khalaf-e Isa District, Hendijan County, Khuzestan Province, Iran. At the 2006 census, its population was 2,701, in 515 families.  The rural district has 9 villages.

References 

Rural Districts of Khuzestan Province
Hendijan County